Mike Colangelo (born October 22, 1976) is an American former outfielder who played in parts of three seasons for the Anaheim Angels, San Diego Padres, and Oakland Athletics of Major League Baseball (MLB).

Amateur career
A native of Teaneck, New Jersey, Colangelo attended C. D. Hylton High School and George Mason University. In 1996, he played collegiate summer baseball with the Chatham A's of the Cape Cod Baseball League and was named a league all-star. He was selected by the Angels in the 21st round of the 1997 MLB Draft.

Professional career
Colangelo made his MLB debut in 1999 with the Angels. He was claimed off waivers by San Diego in 2000, and had his most productive major league season there in 2001, playing in 50 games for the Padres and batting .242. Prior to the 2002 season, he signed as a free agent with Oakland, and appeared in 20 games for the Athletics in what was his final major league campaign.

References

External links

1976 births
Living people
Albuquerque Isotopes players
American expatriate baseball players in Canada
Anaheim Angels players
Baseball players from New Jersey
Cedar Rapids Kernels players
Chatham Anglers players
Edmonton Trappers players
Erie SeaWolves players
George Mason Patriots baseball players
Lake Elsinore Storm players
Major League Baseball outfielders
Mobile BayBears players
Oakland Athletics players
People from Teaneck, New Jersey
Portland Beavers players
Sacramento River Cats players
San Diego Padres players
Sportspeople from Bergen County, New Jersey
Syracuse SkyChiefs players